Lycée Frédéric Mistral may refer to:
  in Avignon
 Lycée Frédéric Mistral in Fresnes, Val-de-Marne
 Lycée Frédéric Mistral (Marseille) in Marseille
 Lycée Frédéric Mistral (Nîmes) in Nîmes